Shinagawa Lighthouse was a lighthouse in Shinagawa (品川第二砲台), south of Tokyo, Japan.

The lighthouse was the third of the four lighthouses built by French engineer Léonce Verny. It was relocated to the Meiji Mura historical theme park near Nagoya.

Later lighthouses would be built by the English engineer Richard Henry Brunton, until the Japanese would take over lighthouse construction in 1880.

See also

 List of lighthouses in Japan

References

Lighthouses completed in 1870
Lighthouses in Japan
Buildings and structures in Tokyo
1870 establishments in Japan
Shinagawa